The 2018 South Sydney Rabbitohs season was the 109th in the club's history. Coached by Anthony Seibold and captained by  Greg Inglis, they competed in the National Rugby League's 2018 Telstra Premiership.

Squad movements

Gains

Losses

Ladder

Pre-season

Regular season
Home games in bold

Finals

Representative Honor's

Domestic

International

Individual Honor's

References

 South Sydney Rabbitohs seasons
South Sydney Rabbitohs seasons